Capuano is an Italian surname referring to the Italian city of Capua. Notable people with the surname include:

Antonio Capuano (actor) (died 1963), Argentine actor
Barry Capuano (born 1940), Australian footballer
Cara Capuano, American sportscaster
Chris Capuano (born 1978), American baseball pitcher
Ciro Capuano (born 1981), Italian footballer
Dave Capuano (born 1968), American ice hockey player
Dom Capuano (born 1975), Italian music producer and composer
Ezio Capuano, (born 1965), Italian football coach
Francesco Capuano Di Manfredonia, 15th-century Italian astronomer
Jack Capuano (born 1966), American ice hockey player and coach
Luigi Capuano (born 1904), Italian film director and screenwriter
Marco Capuano (born 1991), Italian footballer
Matthew Capuano (born 1975), Australian-rules footballer
Mike Capuano (born 1952), American politician, congressman from Massachusetts
Peter of Capua (died 1214), Italian theologian, philosopher, and churchman, sometimes called Peter Capuano
Rico Capuano, Scottish musician known as Rico (artist)

See also
Castel Capuano, a castle in Naples, named for its situation on the road to Capua

Italian-language surnames